Shadreck Mlauzi (born 6 January 1980) is a Zimbabwean football manager and teacher.

Career
Mlauzi coached the Zimbabwe's women national football team at their first appearance at the Summer Olympics in 2016.

Personal life
Mlauzi studied sports science at Zimbabwe Open University. He works as a physical education teacher at Sikhulile High School.

References

External links
 
 
 Shadreck Mlauzi at Soccerdonna.de 

1980 births
Living people
Zimbabwean football managers
Women's association football managers
Zimbabwe women's national football team managers
Zimbabwe Open University alumni